Haunted People is a 1932 German-Czech drama film directed by Friedrich Feher and starring Magda Sonja, Hans Feher, and Eugen Klöpfer. It was shot at the Staaken Studios in Berlin and on location in Marseille. The film's sets were designed by the art directors Robert Neppach and Erwin Scharf.

Cast
 Magda Sonja as Dame ohne Unterleib
 Eugen Klöpfer as Vincenz Olivier
 Hans Feher as Boubou, sein Sohn
 Friedrich Ettel as Bürgermeister
 Emilia Unda as seine Frau
 Camilla Spira as Louise, beider Tochter
 Vladimir Sokoloff as Trödler
 Hugo Fischer-Köppe as Ausrufer
 Fritz Odemar as Polizeichef
 Hermann Picha as  Mann in der Pferdehaut
 Gustav Püttjer as André, Tischlergehilfe
 Paul Rehkopf as Polizeikommissar
 Joseph Schmidt
 Ferdinand Hart

References

Bibliography

External links 
 

1932 films
Films of the Weimar Republic
1930s German-language films
Films directed by Friedrich Feher
German multilingual films
German drama films
Czech drama films
Czechoslovak multilingual films
German black-and-white films
Czechoslovak black-and-white films
1932 drama films
1932 multilingual films
1930s German films
Films shot at Staaken Studios
Films shot in Marseille